Hans Perk (31 December 1961, Amsterdam) is a Danish–Dutch animated film director, animator and editor.

Career 
In a memoir, Hans Perk recounts that in 1978 he became a student of and later assistant animator for the Danish animated film director Børge Ring. In 1988, he co-founded A. Film Production. In 2013, he directed Miffy the Movie, which was nominated for several awards, and won Best Dutch Film at the Cinekid Festival.

Selected filmography

See also 
Karsten Kiilerich–co-founder of A. Film Production, frequent collaborator

References

Notes

External links 

Danish animators
Danish film directors
Danish film editors
1961 births
Living people